The Zlatibor District is one of eight administrative districts of Šumadija and Western Serbia. It is located in the western, mountainous part of Serbia. The district was named after the mountain region of Zlatibor.

As of 2022 census, the district has a population of 257,025 inhabitants. The administrative center of the Zlatibor district is Užice.

Municipalities

The district encompasses the municipalities of:
 Bajina Bašta
 Kosjerić
 Užice
 Požega
 Čajetina
 Arilje
 Nova Varoš
 Prijepolje
 Sjenica
 Priboj

Demographics

As of 2022 census, the district has a population of 257,025 inhabitants.

Ethnic groups
The ethnic composition of the district:

Society and culture

Culture
In the vicinity of Bajina Bašta stands the Rača monastery, built in the 13th century. Over its history, this monastery was destroyed several times and then reconstructed. Rača Monastery's final destruction (after the Turks and the Austro-Hungarian Army), came at the hands of Bulgarian forces in 1943. It was renovated and restored after the end of World War II. The church was an important center of transcription and illumination of Serbia's manuscripts, with its monks known as the Račani, during the 17th century.

The Mileševa Monastery, built in 1234 near Prijepolje, was the endowment of King Stefan Vladislav I of Serbia, the son of Stefan the First-Crowned.

This monastery was the second most important in Serbia, after it received the bones of Serbia's most-revered patriarch, Saint Sava, in 1236. The monastery has been destroyed and rebuilt several times, though 100 compositions, frescoes of individual figures, and fragments of important religious icons have been preserved. The most famous icon of Mileševa is The White Angel fresco, a famous, widely used religious icon throughout Serbia.

Tourism
The Zlatibor District is home to several tourist destinations. Visitors to the slopes of Zlatibor Mountain, explore the natural environment of Tara National Park, float down the Drina River or cruise Lake Perućac, ride the rail experience known as Šargan Eight, visit the traditional ethnic village of Mokra Gora, tour the World War II monument of Kadinjača Memorial Complex, immerse themselves in the history of Užice and its importance as an independent stronghold, or visit Kremna, home of the Prophecy from Kremna.

Education
There is one faculty located in the Zlatibor District that is within the University of Kragujevac:
 Teachers Training Faculty in Užice

See also
 Administrative divisions of Serbia
 List of districts of Serbia
 Zlatibor

References

Note: All official material made by the Government of Serbia is public by law. Information was taken from the 

.

External links

 

 
Districts of Šumadija and Western Serbia